Naziha Réjiba also known as Om Ziad is a Tunisian journalist.  She edits the online journal Kalima.

In 2000, Réjiba co-founded Kalima, along with Sihem Bensedrine.  In 2001, Réjiba and Bensedrine founded Observatoire de la Liberté de la Presse, de L'Edition et de la Création (OLPEC), a group that promotes freedom of the press and which is banned in Tunisia.

Réjiba has repeatedly been harassed by the Tunisian government. She has repeatedly been interrogated by police, and she is under constant surveillance.  Additionally, her journal, Kalima, is blocked in Tunisia. In 2007, Rejiba received a series of anonymous threats and was the target of a smear campaign involving obscene, fabricated photographs of her husband. In 2008, vandals hacked into the Kalima web page, shutting it down. Réjiba accused the government of being responsible for vandalism in an article, and was summoned to court.

In 2009, she won an International Press Freedom Award from the Committee to Protect Journalists. The award is given for journalists who show courage in defending press freedom in the face of attacks, threats or imprisonment.

References

Tunisian women journalists
Living people
Year of birth missing (living people)
20th-century Tunisian women
21st-century Tunisian women writers
21st-century Tunisian writers